Starokucherbayevo (İśke Küsärbay) is a rural locality (a village) and the administrative centre of Kucherbayevsky Selsoviet, Blagovarsky District, Bashkortostan, Russia. The population was 1,309 as of 2010. There are 16 streets.

Geography 
Starokucherbayevo is located 33 km north of Yazykovo (the district's administrative centre) by road. Staroabzanovo is the nearest rural locality.

References 

Rural localities in Blagovarsky District